Paper Flower is a short narrative film by Toy Gun Films that was premiered in Tokyo in February 2011. It was first shown in the U.S. at the Beverly Hills Film Festival on April 8, 2011. Paper Flower was directed by Brent Ryan Green, written by Jeff Goldberg, and produced by Toy Gun Films Toy Gun Films The cinematographer was Thomas Marvel and the music was composed by Aska Matsumiya Your Enemies Friends.

The film was inspired by a collection of true stories surrounding the issue of Enjo-kōsai (援助交際) or compensated dating and materialism that families face throughout Tokyo. Paper Flower focuses on the friendship of two childhood friends growing up in Tokyo where a casual form of prostitution known as compensated dating has become a disturbing trend. When they each experience heartbreaking losses, they are forced to decide how much of themselves they are willing to give in order to find true love.

Plot
Asuka (Anna Ishibashi) and her best childhood friend, Michi (Ayami Kakiuchi), are young girls who live in the fast, savvy city of Tokyo, where being fashionable is not a social cliché, but a social requirement. Although the girls are leading two different kinds of lives, they find they must decide how much of themselves they must give up in order to find true love. The film follows the story of Asuka as she compromises herself in order to get what she thinks she wants, but instead, she finds something entirely different that she never knew she wanted or needed.

Cast
 Anna Ishibashi - Asuka 
 Ayami Kakiuchi - Michi 
 Yasunari Takeshima - Toru (Asuka’s father)
 Asuka Kurosawa - Reiko (Asuka’s mother)
 Kenichi Takitoh - Kiyoshi (Michi’s father) 
 Mariko Tsutsui - Masami (Michi’s mother) 
 Yoshiyuki Morishita - Ukita (Businessman)
 Jurie Takeda - Young Asuka 
 Shunya Tajima - Adult Man

Festivals
Paper Flower has been officially selected for:
Beverly Hills Film Festival 2010
DeadCENTER Film Festival
New Filmmakers Film Festival
Showbiz Expo
Mosaic Film Festival of Los Angeles - won 1st Place of Best Short Film and Audience Choice Awards
The Film Festival of Colorado
Breckenridge Film Festival - won Best Spiritual
The Indie Fest - won Merit Award for Short Film and Direction
San Antonio Film Festival
Transforming Stories International Christian Film Festival
Indie Gathering International Film Festival - won 4th Place
Accolade Competition - won Award of Merit for Short Film
Texas International Film Festival
Ruby Mountain Film Festival
3rd Inigo International Film Festival
HollyShorts Film Festival
Williamsburg International Film Festival
Route 66 International Film Festival
SoCal Film Festival -  Honorable Mention
Heartland Truly Moving Pictures Film Festival
Miami Short Film Festival
Tallgrass International Film Festival

References

External links
 

2011 films
2011 drama films
2011 short films
2010s Japanese-language films
American drama short films
Japanese short films
Japanese drama films
Films produced by Brent Ryan Green
Films set in Tokyo
Films directed by Brent Ryan Green
2010s American films
2010s Japanese films